Yang Qian (杨倩; born 10 July 2000) is a Chinese sport shooter. She represented China at the 2020 Summer Olympics in Tokyo in summer of 2021, where she won two gold medals.

Born in Ningbo, a port city in southeastern China's Zhejiang province, she started shooting training at the age of 10. She is currently a third-year undergraduate studying economics and management at  Tsinghua University in Beijing.

On July 14, 2021, Yang was listed as part of the official Chinese sport shooting delegation for the 2020 Tokyo Olympic Games. On 24 July 2021, she won the gold medal in women's 10 metre air rifle, which is the first gold medal of this Olympiad. Three days later, she teamed with Yang Haoran to win the gold medal in mixed 10 metre air rifle team in the event's debut on the Olympic stage.

References

2000 births
Living people
Chinese female sport shooters
Shooters at the 2020 Summer Olympics
Olympic shooters of China
Sportspeople from Ningbo
Medalists at the 2020 Summer Olympics
Olympic gold medalists for China
Olympic medalists in shooting